The Student may refer to:

The Student (2011 film), an Argentine film
The Student (2016 film), a Russian film
The Student, a 1961 Egyptian film directed by Hassan al-Imam
The Student, a 2017 film starring Blake Michael
The Student (newspaper), a newspaper by students at the University of Edinburgh
"The Student" (short story), a work by Anton Chekhov
The Student (novel), see Cary Fagan

See also
 The Student's, former name of the Japanese musical duo marble
 Student (disambiguation)